Village Shires is a community within Northampton Township, Bucks County in the U.S. state of Pennsylvania. It is defined by the U.S. Census Bureau as a census-designated place (CDP) for statistical purposes and does not have any legal status as a separately incorporated municipality. The population was 3,949 at the 2010 census.

Geography
Village Shires is located at  (40.200808, -74.971928).

Community association

Almost every residence in the census designation of Village Shires is part of the Village Shires Community Association.  Village Shires is governed by a 7-member community board of directors.  The board of directors sets and approves the budget, hires the on-site management, hires the in-house landscaping crew, purchases equipment, contracts with vendors to maintain recreational facilities and community maintenance, and sets community rules and regulations.  The on-site management offices are located at 3001 East Village Road.

Village Shires is managed by the Village Shires Community Association (VSCA).  The VSCA includes single homes - Heather Valley I and II; townhouses - Country Place I and II, Bridleridge, Natura, and Millpond; and six independent condominium associations, Beacon Hill, Signal Hill/Heritage Place, Tamerlane, Canterbury Croft, Hamlet, and Old Jordan Woods.

In an attempt to facilitate economies of operation, the six condominium associations annually contract with the VSCA to perform combined community services. The VSCA oversees landscaping, snow removal, maintenance, and operation of recreational and common areas through supervisory and contractual agreements with the Danella Management and Realty Co. Inc., an on-site management company.

Community-wide elections are held every November to fill vacant positions on the VSCA Executive Board for the ensuing calendar year.  In an effort to ensure continuity of operations, board positions overlap and span two year terms.  There are also several committees that report to the executive board, such as the Architectural Control Committee, which assists the executive board in approving or denying requests to make additions and alterations to townhomes by owners.

The Board of Directors meets monthly with the on-site manager to discuss and supervise finances, community matters, correspondence, contractual agreements, vendor and contractor performance, budgetary matters and any other issues pertinent to the community.

Demographics

As of the census of 2000, there were 4,137 people, 1,714 households, and 1,064 families residing in the CDP. The population density was 3,477.5 people per square mile (1,342.3/km). There were 1,751 housing units at an average density of 1,471.9/sq mi (568.1/km). The racial makeup of the CDP was 97.10% White, 0.60% African American, 0.12% Native American, 0.94% Asian, 0.48% from other races, and 0.75% from two or more races. Hispanic or Latino of any race were 0.97% of the population.

There were 1,714 households, out of which 29.0% had children under the age of 18 living with them, 53.2% were married couples living together, 7.5% had a female householder with no husband present, and 37.9% were non-families. 34.7% of all households were made up of individuals, and 18.0% had someone living alone who was 65 years of age or older. The average household size was 2.37 and the average family size was 3.11.

In the CDP, the population was spread out, with 22.3% under the age of 18, 6.0% from 18 to 24, 28.4% from 25 to 44, 26.1% from 45 to 64, and 17.2% who were 65 years of age or older. The median age was 41 years. For every 100 females, there were 82.3 males. For every 100 females age 18 and over, there were 77.7 males.

The median income for a household in the CDP was $61,424, and the median income for a family was $83,707. Males had a median income of $55,260 versus $37,295 for females. The per capita income for the CDP was $32,198. None of the families and 1.0% of the population were living below the poverty line, including no under eighteens and 2.7% of those over 64.

References

Census-designated places in Bucks County, Pennsylvania
Census-designated places in Pennsylvania